Saint Saturninus may refer to:

Saturninus (died c. 203), companion of Saints Perpetua and Felicity, martyred in Carthage, feast day: 7 March
Saturnin of Toulouse (died c. 257), first bishop of Toulouse, France, feast day: 29 November
Saturninus (died c. 303), name of four of the Martyrs of Zaragoza, feast day: 16 April
Saturninus (died 304), one of the Martyrs of Abitina, feast day: 12 February
Saturninus of Cagliari (died c. 304), martyred in Sardinia, feast day: 30 October
Saturninus the Martyr (died 304), martyred in Rome, feast day: 22 March
Saturninus, one of the Seven Robbers martyred on Corfu in the 2nd century

See also
Saturninus (disambiguation)
Saint-Saturnin (disambiguation)
Saturnina, Christian virgin martyr
Sant Sadurní (disambiguation)